Noma is a town in Holmes County, Florida, United States.  The population was 211 at the 2010 census.

Geography

Demographics

As of the census of 2000, there were 213 people, 91 households, and 54 families residing in the town. The racial makeup of the town was 77.93% White, 19.25% African American, 0.94% Pacific Islander, 0.47% from other races, and 1.41% from two or more races. Hispanic or Latino of any race were 1.41% of the population.

There were 91 households, out of which 28.6% had children under the age of 18 living with them, 38.5% were married couples living together, 14.3% had a female householder with no husband present, and 39.6% were non-families. 36.3% of all households were made up of individuals, and 20.9% had someone living alone who was 65 years of age or older. The average household size was 2.34 and the average family size was 3.07.

In the town, the population was spread out, with 23.5% under the age of 18, 8.0% from 18 to 24, 31.0% from 25 to 44, 22.1% from 45 to 64, and 15.5% who were 65 years of age or older. The median age was 39 years. For every 100 females, there were 95.4 males. For every 100 females age 18 and over, there were 83.1 males.

The median income for a household in the town was $26,250, and the median income for a family was $40,625. Males had a median income of $20,000 versus $21,250 for females. The per capita income for the town was $10,958. About 14.3% of families and 18.3% of the population were below the poverty line, including 17.5% of those under the age of eighteen and 33.3% of those 65 or over.

References

Towns in Holmes County, Florida
Towns in Florida